The Richmond Virginians were a AAA baseball team from 1954 to 1964.

Richmond Virginians may also refer to:

 Richmond Virginians (1884), major league baseball team
 Richmond Virginians (chorus), barbershop chorus
 People from Richmond, Virginia
 People from Richmond County, Virginia

See also
 Virginian (disambiguation)
 Richmond (disambiguation)